Serest, also rendered as Sar Rost, may refer to:
 Bala Serest
 Pain Serest